Khairpur Tamewali Tehsil is an administrative tehsil (subdivision" of Bahawalpur District in the Punjab province of Pakistan. The city of Khairpur Tamewali is the tehsil headquarters which is administratively subdivided into eight union councils.

Organisation and demographics
Khairpur Tamewali Tehsil's municipal administration is headed by the Tehsil Municipal Administrator while TMOs are also available to monitor developmental, sanitary, and infra-structure projects.

The main administrative districts are Khairpur Tamewali, Behli, Guddan, Inaiti, Israni, Jhandani, Kotla Qaim Khan and Syed Imam Shah.

Khairpur Tamewali is used for military training purposes due to its geographical area. Most of the desert area is under the control of the Pakistan Army. There is also a military airbase which is used to train multiple air forces including those of Saudi Arabia, Egypt, United Arab Emirates, China, Oman and Pakistan.

Languages include Saraiki, Punjabi, and Urdu.

Shrine of famous Sufi saint Peer Syed Ghulam Mohyudin Gillani (Peer Syed Chup Shah Sarkar) is located near Khairpur Tamiwali Police Station, he is one of the descendants of Ghaus Pak Abdul Qadir Gillani and also from the family of Muhammad. His son Chan Peer is also interred with him. 

Another ancient 200+ years old Shrine of Syed Badar Shah Gillani is present nearby. 

Hazrat Khawaja Khuda Bux shrine is also famous for its annual event gatherings for Mela (Urs Khwaja Khuda Bux).

References

Languages 
Saraiki is the base language of Khairpur Tamewali To communicate Mostly spoken languages are Saraiki, Urdu, Punjabi 

Tehsils of Bahawalpur District